

Valmeyer is a village in Monroe County, Illinois, on the Mississippi River.  The population was 1,263 at the 2010 United States Census.

History 
After the Great Flood of 1993 the residents of Valmeyer decided to relocate the town two miles to the east, on higher ground. The town was rebuilt with financial assistance from the Federal Emergency Management Agency. The old townsite has been described as a ghost town with few inhabitants but still an important traffic artery. Valmeyer's successful relocation is seen as a potential model for other localities retreating from sea level rise.

Geography

Demographics

As of the census of 2000, there were 608 people, 222 households, and 166 families residing in the village. The racial makeup of the village was 98.68% White, 0.33% African American, 0.33% Asian, 0.16% Pacific Islander, and 0.49% from two or more races. Hispanic or Latino of any race were 0.82% of the population.

There were 222 households, out of which 39.2% had children under the age of 18 living with them, 64.0% were married couples living together, 9.9% had a female householder with no husband present, and 25.2% were non-families. 24.8% of all households were made up of individuals, and 14.9% had someone living alone who was 65 years of age or older. The average household size was 2.74 and the average family size was 3.29.

In the village, the age distribution of the population shows 27.8% under the age of 18, 10.0% from 18 to 24, 28.1% from 25 to 44, 21.1% from 45 to 64, and 13.0% who were 65 years of age or older. The median age was 36 years. For every 100 females there were 87.1 males. For every 100 females age 18 and over, there were 79.9 males.

Males had a median income of $38,500 versus $26,838 for females. None of the families and 3.0% of the population were living below the poverty threshold, including no under eighteens and 10.2% of those over 64.

References

External links
 Valmeyer Community Unit School District #3
 Current Village of Valmeyer Website
 Village of Valmeyer Website as of 12 April 2019

Metro East
Villages in Monroe County, Illinois
Ghost towns in Illinois